Josh van Eeden (born 11 July 1996) is a South African cricketer. He made his List A debut for KwaZulu-Natal Inland in the 2016–17 CSA Provincial One-Day Challenge on 26 March 2017. He made his first-class debut for KwaZulu-Natal Inland in the 2018–19 CSA 3-Day Provincial Cup on 8 November 2018.

References

External links
 

1996 births
Living people
South African cricketers
KwaZulu-Natal Inland cricketers
Place of birth missing (living people)